Gabriel Randolph Burnett (born 20 September 1975) is a retired Barbadian athlete who specialised in the 110 metres hurdles. He represented his country at the 2000 Summer Olympics failing to qualify for the second round.

His personal best in the event is 13.62 seconds set in 2000.

Competition record

References

1975 births
Living people
Barbadian male hurdlers
Athletes (track and field) at the 2000 Summer Olympics
Olympic athletes of Barbados
Athletes (track and field) at the 1998 Commonwealth Games
Athletes (track and field) at the 2002 Commonwealth Games
Athletes (track and field) at the 1999 Pan American Games
Commonwealth Games competitors for Barbados
Pan American Games competitors for Barbados